Mia Buric (born 23 May 1982) is a former German tennis player. She has won 3 singles and 2 doubles titles on the ITF tour in her career. Her career-high ranking is world number 204 was achieved in July 2000. Her highest ranking in doubles is world number 176 on 11 June 2001. Buric retired from professional tennis in 2003.

WTA career finals

Doubles: 1 (0–1)

Junior Grand Slam finals

Doubles

ITF Circuit finals

Singles (3–2)

Doubles (2–3)

References

External links
 
 

1982 births
Living people
Tennis players from Split, Croatia
German female tennis players
German people of Croatian descent